Eodorcadion carinatum is a species of beetle in the family Cerambycidae. It was described by Fabriciu in 1781. It is known from Mongolia.

Subspecies
 Eodorcadion carinatum blessigi (Ganglbauer, 1884)
 Eodorcadion carinatum bramsoni (Pic, 1901)
 Eodorcadion carinatum carinatum (Fabricius, 1781)
 Eodorcadion carinatum involvens (Fischer von Waldheim, 1823)
 Eodorcadion carinatum kiahtenum Danilevsky, 2007

References

Dorcadiini
Beetles described in 1781